Asura rubrimargo is a moth of the family Erebidae. It is found in India.

References

rubrimargo
Moths described in 1894
Moths of Asia